Strange Times may refer to:
 Strange Times (The Chameleons album)
 Strange Times (Moody Blues album), and the title track
 Strange Times (The Black Keys song)
 Strange Times (Mohsen Namjoo song)
 Strange Times, a young adult novel and television franchise created by To the Stars
 Strange Times: The Ghost in the Girl, a 2016 novel